Kanifushi as a place name may refer to:
 Kanifushi (Baa Atoll) (Republic of Maldives)
 Kanifushi (Lhaviyani Atoll) (Republic of Maldives)